Fedwire (formerly known as the Federal Reserve Wire Network) is a real-time gross settlement funds transfer system operated by the United States Federal Reserve Banks that allows financial institutions to electronically transfer funds between its more than 9,289 participants (as of March 19, 2009). Transfers can only be initiated by the sending bank once they receive the proper wiring instructions for the receiving bank. These instructions include: the receiving bank's routing number, account number, name and dollar amount being transferred. This information is submitted to the Federal Reserve via the Fedwire system. Once the instructions are received and processed, the Fed will debit the funds from the sending bank's reserve account and credit the receiving bank's account. Wire transfers sent via Fedwire are completed the same business day, with many being completed instantly.

In conjunction with Clearing House Interbank Payments System (CHIPS), operated by The Clearing House Payments Company, a private company, Fedwire is the primary U.S. network for large-value or time-critical domestic and international payments, and it is designed to be highly resilient. In 2012, CHIPS was designated a systemically important financial market utility (SIFMU) under Title VIII of the Dodd–Frank Act, which means that CHIPS is subject to heightened regulatory scrutiny by the Federal Reserve Board.

The Fedwire system has grown since its inception, seeing growth in both number of transfers and total transaction dollar value of about 79% and 207% respectively between 1996 and 2016. In 2016, roughly 148.1 million transfers were valued at $766.7 trillion.

History
In the early 1900s, settlement of interbank payments was often done by the physical delivery of cash or gold. By 1915, The Federal Reserve Banks began to move funds electronically. In 1918, the Banks established a proprietary telecommunications system to process funds transfers, connecting all 12 Reserve Banks, the Federal Reserve Board and the U.S. Treasury by telegraph using Morse code. Starting in the 1920s up until the 1970s, the system remained largely telegraphic; however as technology improved, they began to make the shift from telegraphy towards telex, then to computer operations and then to proprietary telecommunications networks.

In the early 1980s, Fedwire was taxed to its limit with the result that it was often subject to "throttle", which means that it took messages from the banks more slowly than its normal speed. From a user's point of view, throttle was like being put on hold every time one sent a message to the Fed. In 1983, the Fed made a major upgrade of the automated system it uses to support Fedwire. Because the major banks could not tolerate a long breakdown in their computer operations, the Fed designed its internal systems so that the maximum down time for a breakdown would be limited to a few minutes or a few hours at most. In an effort to improve operational efficiency, in the 1990s, the Reserve Banks consolidated most mainframe computer operations and centralized certain payment applications. More recently, the Reserve Banks have taken advantage of the flexibility and efficiency that Internet protocol (IP) and distributed processing technologies offer. These technologies have improved reliability and efficiency of Fedwire greatly. Today, three data processing centers support the Fedwire services. One site supports the primary processing environment with on-site backup. A second site serves an active, "hot" backup facility with on-site backup. A third site serves as a "warm" backup facility. The three data processing centers are located a considerable distance from one another (i.e., hundreds of miles) in order to mitigate the effects of natural disasters, power and telecommunication outages, and other wide-scale, regional disruptions. In addition, all three data processing centers have appropriate security and include various contingency features, such as redundant power feeds, environmental and emergency control systems, dual computer and network operations centers, and dual customer service centers.

Until 1981, Fedwire services were provided free and were available only to Federal Reserve member banks. The Depository Institutions Deregulation and Monetary Control Act of 1980 required most Federal Reserve Bank financial services to be priced, while giving nonmember depository institutions direct access to these priced services. Fees were now applicable to several services, including funds transfers and securities safekeeping. Banks are charged a gross transfer fee of $0.82 for every transaction, however there is a three-tiered discount schedule, which results in actual transaction fees costing between $0.034 and $0.82 per transaction depending on transaction volume.

More recently with the advancement in mobile technologies, many alternative modes of electronic funds transfers have emerged. These alternative modes are changing the way people make payments in that fewer and fewer people are using traditional banking methods to transfer money. Rather than transfer money from bank to bank, they are opting to transfer the funds directly to the other party via a mobile application. With fewer people using traditional banks, and fewer people transferring money from bank to bank, the volume of transactions going through Fedwire on a daily basis is also likely to decline. With this type of electronic funds transfers, corporations act much like the Fed by using their commercial bank accounts for processing and transferring payments between individuals. Many of these systems like PayPal, Venmo, and Bitcoin are accessible on mobile devices and are much cheaper for consumers than a wire sent via the Fedwire system.

See also 
Daylight overdraft
FedACH
Real-time gross settlement (RTGS)
National Automated Clearing House (NACH)
Society for Worldwide Interbank Financial Telecommunication (SWIFT)
Structured Financial Messaging System (SFMS)
System for Transfer of Financial Messages (SPFS)
Wire transfer

References
Notes

Bibliography

External links 
 

Real-time gross settlement
Federal Reserve System
Interbank networks